Epicrocis umbratella is a species of snout moth in the genus Epicrocis. It was described by Pagenstecher in 1907. It is found in Madagascar.

References

Phycitini
Lepidoptera of Madagascar
Moths of Madagascar
Moths of Africa
Moths described in 1907